Squaw Creek Bridge 2 is located in Harrison Township in rural Boone County, Iowa, United States. The Marsh arch bridge was designed by Des Moines engineer James B. Marsh, and built by the N.E. Marsh & Son Construction Company of Des Moines in 1918. The bridge was listed on the National Register of Historic Places in 1998.

References

Bridges completed in 1918
Bridges in Boone County, Iowa
Arch bridges in Iowa
Road bridges on the National Register of Historic Places in Iowa
National Register of Historic Places in Boone County, Iowa